Allen Jerome Pinkett (born January 25, 1964) is a former professional American football player who played running back for six seasons for the Houston Oilers.  He grew up in the Sterling, Virginia, area and attended Park View High School from 1978-1982.

College playing career
Pinkett was a two-time All-American at Notre Dame who played in the Gerry Faust era. In 1985, he was eighth in the Heisman balloting.  He was Notre Dame's career rushing leader with 4,131 yards until Autry Denson broke his record in 1998, with  4,318 yards. Pinkett was the first Notre Dame player ever to rush for 1,000 yards in three consecutive seasons. He had 1,179 in 1983, 1,268 in 1984 and 1,176 in 1985. He remains the Irish career scoring leader with 53 touchdowns, including 49 rushing. He is tied with Vagas Ferguson (1976–1979) for the most rushing touchdowns in a single season. Pinkett had 17 touchdowns in 1984 and Ferguson had 17 in 1979. Pinkett scored 4 touchdowns against Penn State at Happy Valley on November 12, 1983, and scored 3 against the Nittany Lions at Notre Name Stadium on November 17, 1984.

Professional playing career
Pinkett played six seasons for the Houston Oilers, from 1986-91.  In his career with the Oilers, he gained 2,624 yards rushing with 21 touchdowns, and caught 119 passes and 5 touchdowns.  He was the team's leading rusher in his final year, 1991, with 720 yards.

Post-playing career
Pinkett served as the color commentator for Notre Dame's football games broadcast by IMG College from 2006-2018. He was removed from the broadcasting team on August 30, 2012, following inappropriate remarks. In 2010, he split play-by-play partners with Don Criqui, who did home Notre Dame's football games, and Dick Enberg, who did road Notre Dame's football games. He was also a sideline reporter for the NFL on Westwood One and did color analyzing with Jim Henderson on radio broadcasts for the New Orleans Saints.

Suspension
On August 29, 2012, Pinkett appeared on WSCR in Chicago and said that there's nothing wrong with having "a few bad citizens" on Notre Dame's roster, and that a team "full of choirboys" wouldn't win many games.  Given a chance to clarify his remarks, Pinkett claimed that winning teams always had "a couple of criminals" on their rosters.  Notre Dame's athletic department harshly condemned Pinkett's remarks, and IMG suspended him for three games.

References

1964 births
Living people
American football running backs
College football announcers
Houston Oilers players
National Football League announcers
New Orleans Saints announcers
Notre Dame Fighting Irish football players
Notre Dame Fighting Irish football announcers
People from Sterling, Virginia
Players of American football from Virginia
Players of American football from Washington, D.C.